General elections were held in Bolivia on 31 May 1964. Víctor Paz Estenssoro of the Revolutionary Nationalist Movement (MNR) was the only candidate for president, and was re-elected with 98% of the vote. The MNR retained its large majority in Congress.

Results

Aftermath
Following the elections, General René Barrientos led a military coup in November 1964, removing Paz from office. The coup led to a series of authoritarian and military regimes that remained in power until 1982.

References

Elections in Bolivia
Bolivia
1964 in Bolivia
Single-candidate elections
Presidential elections in Bolivia